Myanaung District is a district of the Ayeyarwady Region in Myanmar.

The Myanaung District is a newer district grouping three townships formerly part of Hinthada District. The main administrative GAD office was opened on July 1st, 2022. The District consists of Kyangin Township, Myanaung Township and Ingapu Township.

References 

Districts of Myanmar